Goryeojang (고려장) is a 1963 South Korean drama film edited, written, produced and directed by Kim Ki-young.

Plot
The film tells the story of a poor farm-worker who, according to local tradition, must take his 70-year-old mother into the mountains to die. Deciding to break the custom, he instead returns home with his mother. The film has the similar subject as the Japanese films, The Ballad of Narayama (1958) (Keisuke Kinoshita) and The Ballad of Narayama (1983) (Shohei Imamura).

Cast
Kim Jin-kyu
Ju Jeung-ryu
Kim Bo-ae
Kim Dong-won
Park Am

Release
In February 2012, Taewon Entertainment, in partnership with the Korean Film Archive, had released the film on DVD.

References

Bibliography

External links

Films directed by Kim Ki-young
1960s Korean-language films
South Korean drama films